Skylan Airways was a Jamaican airline that offered both scheduled and charter services. The airline was based at the Norman Manley International Airport.

Skylan Airways flights in Kingston arrived and departed from the Norman Manley International Airport, General Aviation Centre. In Montego Bay the flights arrived and departed from the Sangster International Airport's new domestic terminal. Because of this passengers travelling domestic with Skylan Airways will not be processed by either Jamaican Immigration or Customs at either airport. It began charter operations in August 2009 and its inaugural scheduled flight was on October 29, 2010. In 2012 the airline ceased all operations.

Domestic routes
KIN-Norman Manley International Airport to MBJ-Sangster International Airport.
 Skylan offered charter service from Montego Bay and Kingston to Ocho Rios/Boscobel - OCJ Ian Fleming International Airport -

Charter routes

 Cuba — HAV-Havana, SCU-Santiago de Cuba
 Haiti — PAP-Port-au-Prince
 USA
 Grand Cayman
 Antigua
 Venezuela
 St. Lucia
 Aruba
 Bonaire
 Curaçao

The airline is available for charters to other Caribbean destinations.

Aircraft fleet
 Jetstream 32EP

References

External links
  

Defunct airlines of Jamaica
Airlines established in 2009
Airlines disestablished in 2012
Companies based in Kingston, Jamaica